Sa'id bin Ali bin Wahf Al-Qahtani (1952–2018) was a Saudi Arabian Muslim scholar and writer. Qahtani was born in the village of Al-Arin, 'Asir region, in 1952. He also served as the imam of mosque in Saudi Arabia. His authored about eighty books, the most famous of which is the book Hisnul Muslim (Fortress Of The Muslim). He was suffering from liver cancer and died on October 1, 2018 in Riyadh.

References

2018 deaths
Saudi Arabian writers
Saudi Arabian Islamic religious leaders
1952 births